Get It Right is the twenty-ninth studio album by American singer Aretha Franklin, released on July 14, 1983, by Arista Records. It was produced by Luther Vandross, following his successful teaming with the singer for the Gold-certified album, Jump to It, in 1982. Get It Right was not as commercially successful, and Franklin did not have Vandross produce any further albums.

The disc's title song became a number 1 hit on Billboards R&B singles chart, but it stalled at only number 61 on the Billboard Hot 100. The album was a critical and commercial failure, selling about 200,000 copies in the US. It was re-issued on compact disc in the late 1990s.

Track listing

All tracks written by Luther Vandross and Marcus Miller; except where noted.

 "Get It Right" – 6:22
 "Pretender" – 4:17
 "Every Girl (Wants My Guy)" – 6:29
 "When You Love Me Like That" – 3:47
 "I Wish It Would Rain" (Barrett Strong, Norman Whitfield, Roger Penzabene) – 4:40
 "Better Friends Than Lovers" (Michael Lovesmith) – 4:10
 "I Got Your Love" (Luther Vandross) – 5:30
 "Giving In" (Clarence Franklin) – 4:38

Personnel

Performers

 Aretha Franklin – lead vocals, backing vocals (3), vocal arrangements (3, 6) 
 Nat Adderley Jr. – keyboards (1-8), rhythm arrangements (5-8)
 Marcus Miller – synthesizers (1-4), bass guitar (1-8), rhythm arrangements (1-4)
 Doc Powell – guitar (1-8)
 Georg Wadenius – guitar (1-7)
 Teddy F. White – guitar (8)
 Yogi Horton – drums (1-8)
 Paulinho da Costa – percussion (1-5, 8), congas (5), bongos (8)
 Steve Kroon – congas (1, 2, 3, 7), triangle (1)
 Dave Friedman – vibraphone (1, 3)
 David Carey – timpani (5)
 Rob Mounsey – string arrangements (2, 4), horn arrangements (4)
 Paul Riser – string and horn arrangements (5-8)
 George Young – soprano saxophone (8)
 Luther Vandross – vocal arrangements (1-4, 7, 8), backing vocals (1, 2, 4, 7, 8)
 Brenda White – backing vocals (1)
 Fonzi Thornton – backing vocals (1, 2)
 Michelle Cobbs – backing vocals (1, 2)
 Phillip Ballou – backing vocals (1, 2)
 Tawatha Agee – backing vocals (1, 2)
 Yvonne Lewis – backing vocals (1, 2)
 Cissy Houston – backing vocals (4, 7, 8)
 Darlene Love – backing vocals (4, 7)
 Paulette McWilliams – backing vocals (4, 7, 8)
 Brenda Corbett – backing vocals (5)
 Margaret Branch – backing vocals (5)
 Sandra Richardson – backing vocals (5)
 Michael Love Smith – vocal arrangements (6), backing vocals (6)
 Aaron T. Smith – backing vocals (6)
 Danny Dedusual Smith – backing vocals (6)
 Myrna Smith – backing vocals (7, 8)
 Alan Rubin, George Young, Gregory Williams, Jim Pugh, John Clark, Jon Faddis, Lew Soloff, Lou Marini, Peter Gordon, Ronnie Cuber, Tom Malone – horns (4-8)
 Alfred Brown, Barry Finclair, Elena Barere, Emanuel Vardi, Guy Lumia, Harold Kohon, Harry Zaratzian, Homer Mensch, Jan Mullen, Jean R. Dane, Jesse Levy, John Beal, John Pintavalle, Jonathan Abramowitz, Joseph Rabushka, Judy Geist, Julien Barber, Kathryn Kienke, Kermit Moore, Lamar Alsop, Lewis Eley, Margaret Ross, Marilyn Wright, Regis Iandiorio, Richard Sortomme, Richard Young, Sanford Allen, Sue Pray, Winterton Garvey – strings (2-8)

Production
 Producer – Luther Vandross
 Production Coordination – Sephra Herman
 Engineer – Don Cuminale
 Additional Engineering – Paul Brocek and Michael Christopher
 Assistant Engineers – Paul Brocek, Michael Christopher and Mark Cobrin
 Mixed by Michael H. Brauer
 Art Direction – Donn Davenport
 Design – Howard Fritzson
 Photography – Francisco Scavullo
 Hairstylists – Andre Douglas and Carlton B. Northern
 Make-up – Way Bandy
 Wardrobe – Rachel Crespin

References

1983 albums
Aretha Franklin albums
Albums produced by Luther Vandross
Albums arranged by Paul Riser
Arista Records albums